In computer science, the ostrich algorithm is a strategy of ignoring potential problems on the basis that they may be exceedingly rare. It is named after the ostrich effect which is defined as "to stick one's head in the sand and pretend there is no problem". It is used when it is more cost-effective to allow the problem to occur than to attempt its prevention.

Use with deadlocks

This approach may be used in dealing with deadlocks in concurrent programming if they are believed to be very rare and the cost of detection or prevention is high. For example, if each PC deadlocks once per 10 years, a single reboot may be less painful than the restrictions needed to prevent it.

A set of processes is deadlocked if each process in the set is waiting for an event that only another process in the set can cause. Usually the event is the release of a currently held resource and none of the processes can run, release resources, and be awakened.

The ostrich algorithm pretends there is no problem and is reasonable to use if deadlocks occur very rarely and the cost of their prevention would be high. The UNIX and Windows operating systems take this approach.

Although using the ostrich algorithm is one of the methods of dealing with deadlocks, other effective methods exist such as dynamic avoidance, banker's algorithm, detection and recovery, and prevention.

Trade-offs

Although efficient, using the Ostrich algorithm trades correctness for convenience. Yet since the algorithm directly deals with extreme cases it is not a large trade-off. In fact, the simplest and most used method to recover from a deadlock is a reboot.

Some algorithms with poor worst-case performance are commonly used because they only exhibit poor performance on artificial cases that do not occur in practice; typical examples are the simplex algorithm and the type-inference algorithm for Standard ML. Quicksort is a sorting algorithm widely accepted as the fastest comparison based sorting algorithm has worst case performance on par with bubblesort which is widely regarded as one of the worst sorting algorithms, but this behavior is expected to occur only very rarely on certain types of input. Issues like integer overflow in programming languages with fixed-width integers are also frequently ignored because they occur only in exceptional cases that do not arise for practical inputs.

See also
Crash-only software
End-to-end principle

References

External links
Ostrich algorithm
Non-Hard Locking Read-Write Locker
Deadlock Basics + Modelling + Ostrich Algorithm

Concurrent algorithms